Vincent Paronnaud (born 20 February 1970), a.k.a. Winshluss, is a French comics artist and filmmaker.

Biography
Paronnaud was born in La Rochelle.  He is French  comic book writer and artist. His works comprise one shots: Super negra (1999), Monsieur Ferraille (2001), Pat Boon (2001), Welcome to the Death Club (2002), Smart monkey (2002), Cornélius ou l'art de la mouscaille et du pinaillage (2007), Pinocchio (2008), Flip et Flopi 1996 1998, In God We Trust (2013) and Les fées - An electric story (2014), as well as comic book series (AUT) Winshluss (2004-2014) and Wizz et Buzz (2006-2007).

Paronnaud is best known for cowriting and codirecting with Marjane Satrapi the highly acclaimed animated film Persepolis (2007), for which they received numerous awards including the Jury Prize at the 2007 Cannes Film Festival as well as an Academy Award nomination for Best Animated Feature.

Awards
 The Cinema for Peace Award for the Most Valuable Film of the Year, shared with Marjane Satrapi for Persepolis in 2008.
 Globe de Cristal for Best Film for Persepolis in 2008
 Prize for best album for Winshluss's Pinocchio, 2009 Festival International de la Bande Dessinée, Angoulême.
 Noor Iranian Film Festival award in 2013 for Best Animation Director, shared with Marjane Satrapi, on Chicken with Plums

Exhibitions
Amour, Galerie Vallois, Paris, France (2009)
Comics are like Far West, Galerie Chappe, Paris (2008)
COOL*

References

External links

1970 births
Living people
French graphic novelists
French comics artists
French comics writers
French male screenwriters
French screenwriters
French male novelists